A sympathectomy is an irreversible procedure during which at least one sympathetic ganglion is removed. One example is the lumbar sympathectomy, which is advised for occlusive arterial disease in which L2 and L3 ganglia along with intervening sympathetic trunk are removed leaving behind the L1 ganglion which is responsible for ejaculation. Another example is endoscopic thoracic sympathectomy.

Indications 
 
 
 Hyperhidrosis
 Raynaud syndrome
 
 
 Neuropathic pain, although this is controversial

References

Neurosurgical procedures